Ahmed Al-Maharmeh (born June 18, 1997) is a Jordanian football player who currently plays as a forward for Sahab .

International career
He played his first international match against Lebanon in an international friendly on 31 August 2016, which Jordan drew 1–1.

International career statistics

References

External links 
 
 
 

1997 births
Living people
Jordanian footballers
Jordan international footballers
Jordan youth international footballers
Sportspeople from Amman
Jordanian Pro League players
Al-Jazeera (Jordan) players
Shabab Al-Ordon Club players
Sahab SC players
Association football forwards